2007 Denmark Open is a darts tournament, which took place in Denmark in 2007.

Results

Last 32

Semi-finals

References

2007 in darts
2007 in Danish sport
Darts in Denmark